USS LST-738 was an  built for the United States Navy during World War II.

LST-738 was laid down on 20 February 1944 at Pittsburgh, Pennsylvania by the Dravo Corporation of Neville Island; launched on 1 April 1944; sponsored by Mrs. John S. Mason; and commissioned on 9 May 1944.

Service history
During World War II LST-738 was assigned to the Asiatic-Pacific theater and participated in the Leyte landings in October 1944 and the Mindoro landings in December.

On 15 December 1944, while off the southern tip of Mindoro, she was hit by a Japanese kamikaze plane and set ablaze. After attempts to control the fires were unsuccessful, LST-738 was abandoned and sunk by the guns of other ships of the invasion fleet.

USS LST-738 earned two battle stars for her World War II service.

The attack
On 15 December 1944, LST-738 was one of thirty LSTs in Task Unit 78.34, under the command of Captain Richard Webb. The Task Unit was operating in support of the landings at Mindoro, scheduled for that day.  A group of approximately ten Mitsubishi A6M 'Zeke', Nakajima Ki-44 'Tojo' and Ki-43 'Oscar' single seat fighters, and Nakajima B5N 'Kate' three seat torpedo bombers began their attack on the Task Unit shortly after 09:10, as the LSTs were positioning for their landings.  Ships within range opened fire, shooting down several of the attackers. Two Kates that survived the initial anti-aircraft fire made a run on LST-738 at a low altitude. Anti-aircraft fire from LST-738 and   hit both planes, but they continued in spite of the damage. The first Kate crashed onto LST-738  amidships, just above the waterline. There was an explosion from the plane's bombs, and a fire from the plane's wreckage. The second Kate dove for LST-738s bridge, but missed and was shot down by Moale, crashing to the port of LST-738.

Damage control parties went to work fighting fires, but the crash had damaged LST-738s fire mains making the fires hard to control. The commanding officer ordered the army troops on board to abandon ship.

LST-738s crew flooded her magazines, which made fire fighting even more difficult. In her hold were drums of aviation gas and a load of oxygen bottles, a certain combination for massive explosions if the fire reached them. A second explosion ripped through the ship, and most of the crew abandoned ship. At that time, Captain J. T. Barnett, the Pharmacist Mate, and a radioman last of the crew still aboard. The Captain destroyed the IFF radar and the SOS radar, then ordered the radioman to the stern and to abandon ship.

A third explosion then threw the Captain and Pharmacist Mate to the bridge deck. The Captain then determined that all hope was lost and that if Moale was to come alongside, it would not help save the ship. The Captain waited to see if Moale wished to come alongside, but a fourth explosion threw him to the deck. Moale backed off rapidly.

The water around LST-738 was covered in oil, and was burning, and a few personnel were observed working hard to swim away. After the Pharmacist Mate jumped over the side, both sides of the ship, the Captain checked for personnel hanging on lines. Several were observed and were ordered away from the ship. The Captain, the last man on board, then went over the side.

The fourth blast had put a hole in Moales bow, killing one of her men and wounding ten others. As for LST-738 crew, no one had died, but several men were injured in the crash, fire and explosions. LST-738 was abandoned as a burning hulk.

References

Notes

Bibliography

 
 
 

 

LST-542-class tank landing ships
Ships sunk by kamikaze attack
World War II shipwrecks in the Pacific Ocean
World War II amphibious warfare vessels of the United States
Ships built in Pittsburgh
1944 ships
Maritime incidents in December 1944
Ships built by Dravo Corporation